Clay Center can refer to a community in the United States:
Clay Center, Kansas
Clay Center, Nebraska
Clay Center, Ohio
Clay Center, West Virginia

It can also refer to an astronomical observatory and learning center at the Dexter School in Brookline, Massachusetts.